Pitcairnia cuatrecasasiana, synonym Pepinia cuatrecasasiana,  is a species of flowering plant in the family Bromeliaceae, native to Ecuador and Colombia. It was first described by Lyman Bradford Smith in 1942. The specific epithet is also spelt cuatrecasana.

References

cuatrecasasiana
Flora of Ecuador
Flora of Colombia
Plants described in 1942